The Public Order Act (Northern Ireland) 1951 (1951 c. 19) was an Act of the Parliament of Northern Ireland. The Act concerned meetings and 'non traditional' parades, although a 1970 amendment considerably broadened the Act's scope to include paramilitary groups and weaponry.

Provisions
The first section of the Act required any person or persons organising a public procession to give 48 hours' notice to a senior officer of the Royal Ulster Constabulary (RUC). The only exceptions were funeral processions and 'public processions which are customarily held along a particular route'. Failing to give notice was an offence against the Act. Any senior RUC officer who decided that the procession might lead to a breach of the peace or serious public disorder could order the route to be changed.

A Minister of Home Affairs who felt that rerouting would not be sufficient to prevent serious disorder could make an order banning any or all parades in that area.

The Act also made it an offence to say or do anything insulting, threatening or abusive at a public meeting or procession; to display anything which would be likely to cause a breach of the peace; or to act in a disorderly manner during a lawful public meetings for the purpose of preventing the purpose of the meeting. Anyone convicted of an offence under the Act could be fined up to £500 or be imprisoned for up to two years, depending on which section the offence was under and the nature of the offence.

Amendment
The Act was amended in 1970 in response to the beginning of the Troubles. The amendment made it an offence to knowingly take part in an illegal procession or meeting; increased the notice required to 72 hours; made it an offence to attempt to prevent, hinder or annoy a legal procession and made it an offence to sit, kneel or lie in a public place to hinder any lawful activity. When considering whether to reroute a parade, the RUC were required to have regard to 'the desirability of not interfering with a public procession customarily held along a particular route'.

Maximum fines and prison terms for lesser offences under the Act were increased. The amendment also banned the wearing of uniforms signifying membership of any political organisation or support for a political aim except at the discretion of the Minister of Home Affairs, specifically banned the formation of paramilitary associations and banned the carrying of offensive weapons in public places.

Repeal
The Act was repealed by the Public Order (Northern Ireland) Order 1987, an order in council made by the British government during the period of direct rule. The new legislation removed the 'traditional processions' exemption and required all parade organisers to give seven days notice to the RUC.

Effects
The Act took over the governance and control of parades in Northern Ireland from the 1922 Special Powers Act. Although a 'customary' parade was never defined, most commentators agree that the clause exempting these parades privileged Orange Order and other Protestant/loyalist marches, as under the Special Powers Act, they had generally been allowed to go wherever they liked, but nationalist and republican parades had been restricted to Catholic-dominated areas. Although loyalist parades were occasionally banned before the beginning of the Troubles, that was very unusual and tended to do severe career damage to the Minister who enacted the ban. Once the Troubles broke out, the Act was used to ban all parades in Northern Ireland for several periods from 1969 to 1972. It remained relatively unusual for loyalist parades to be specifically banned, but their rerouting became much more common.

See also
Public Order Act

References

External links
 Text of the Public Order (Northern Ireland) Order 1987

Acts of the Parliament of Northern Ireland 1951